Bridge deck may refer to

 Deck (bridge), the top surface of a bridge span
 Orthotropic deck, a type of bridge deck
 Bridge deck, a raised forward section of a boat cockpit
 Deck of cards, used in the card game of bridge
 Deck department, a unit aboard naval and merchant ships